Penalty is a 2019 Indian sports film about a football lover Lukram from Manipur. The movie stars Kay Kay Menon alongside debutant Lukram Smil in lead roles. The movie is directed by Shubham Singh.

Cast 

  Lukram Smil as himself
 Kay Kay Menon as Vikram Singh
 Aakash Dabhade as Jugadu a.k.a. Chandan
 Shashank Arora as Parth
 Manjot Singh as Ishwar
 Tasha Bhambra as Pooja
 Bijou Thaangjam as Bijou
 Aamir Rafiq as Cameo

Plot 
Lukram (Lukram Smil), a football aspirant from Manipur, registers in a college in Lucknow named SRMU, as it is well known for producing International level footballers. His roommate Ishwar Singh (Manjot Singh), is a forward in the university team and helps Lukram get into the trials. He impresses the assistant coach Parth (Shashank Arora) who recommends him for the final eleven. However, Lukram faces discrimination from other players and officials due to his North East origin. Discouraged, he goes back to his native village. After counselling from his former coach, he returns and joins another team, the Street Club. This club had Chandan (Akash Dabhade) as coach and his team consisted of underprivileged, but talented players. Lukram showcases his brilliance in an exhibition match against the college team, and finally convinces the team manager Vikram Singh (Kay Kay Menon), who has always been against "Outsiders" in the team, to reinstate him into the college team.

See also 

 Goal (2007 film)
 Football Champion
 Jada (2019 film)

References

External links 
 

Indian sports films
2010s Hindi-language films